António dos Reis Rodrigues (24 June 1918 – 3 February 2009) was a Portuguese Bishop of the Roman Catholic Church.

Biography
Rodrigues was born in Vila Nova de Ourém, Portugal and was ordained a priest on 1 March 1947. Rodrigues was appointed Auxiliary bishop of the Archdiocese of Lisbon, along with titular bishop of Madarsuma, on 25 October 1966 and ordained bishop on 8 January 1967. Rodrigues retired from the Archdiocese of Lisbon on 5 September 1998.

See also

References

External links
Catholic Hierarchy
Lisboa Diocese 

1918 births
2009 deaths
20th-century Roman Catholic bishops in Portugal